James P. Mullins (born September 12, 1928) is a retired United States Air Force four-star general who served as Commander, Air Force Logistics Command (COMAFLC) from 1981 to 1984.

Military career
Mullins was born in 1928, in Jersey City, New Jersey. He enlisted in the U.S. Army Air Forces in 1946. Mullins entered pilot training as an aviation cadet in 1948 and graduated in 1949 with a commission as a second lieutenant. He was assigned to the 2nd Air Refueling Squadron at Davis-Monthan Air Force Base, Arizona, where he flew KB-29M's, the Strategic Air Command's first aerial tanker.

During the Korean War, Mullins participated in combat evaluation of in-flight refueling systems for fighter aircraft while assigned to the Far East Air Forces Bomber Command at Yokota Air Base, Japan. In January 1953, he returned to the United States and was assigned to the 9th Air Refueling Squadron, initially at Davis-Monthan Air Force Base, and later moving with the unit to Mountain Home Air Force Base, Idaho.

In July 1954, Mullins entered aircraft observer/bombardier training at James Connally Air Force Base, Texas, in preparation for an assignment in January 1955 to the 96th Bombardment Wing at Altus Air Force Base, Oklahoma, as a B-47 aircraft commander. He moved with the wing in 1957 to Dyess Air Force Base, Texas, and served as a B-47 aircraft commander and an air training officer until September 1961. He was then assigned to SAC headquarters, Offutt Air Force Base, Nebraska, as the B/RS-70 requirements officer in the Requirements Division, Office of the Deputy Chief of Staff, Operations. He received a Bachelor of Arts degree in business administration from the University of Omaha in 1964, attended the Air War College at Maxwell Air Force Base, Alabama from August 1966 to July 1967, and then completed RF-4C combat crew training.  He also earned a Master of Science degree in international affairs from The George Washington University, Washington D.C., in 1967.

He transferred to Tan Son Nhut Air Base, Republic of Vietnam, in August 1968, where he served with the 460th Tactical Reconnaissance Wing on consecutive assignments as detachment commander, tactical squadron commander and assistant deputy commander for operations. He completed 110 combat missions in RF-4Cs.

Mullins was assigned to Headquarters U.S. Air Force, Washington, D.C., in August 1969 in the Directorate of Operational Requirements and Development Plans, Office of the Deputy Chief of Staff, Research and Development, where he served as chief of the Aircraft Division.  He attended the six-week advanced management program at Harvard Business School in 1972.  In June 1973, he became vice commander, Ogden Air Materiel Area (later renamed Air Logistics Center), Air Force Logistics Command, Hill Air Force Base, Utah.

He was assigned as deputy chief of staff for acquisition logistics, Air Force Logistics Command at Wright-Patterson Air Force Base, in March 1975. He was reassigned within the command staff as deputy chief of staff for plans and operations in May 1975. This organization was renamed Office of the Deputy Chief of Staff for Plans and Programs in August 1975. He then returned to Hill Air Force Base as commander of the Ogden Air Logistics Center in August 1977.

In November 1978, Mullins took command of 15th Air Force at March Air Force Base, California. He assumed command of Air Force Logistics Command in July 1981. Mullins retired from the Air Force on November 1, 1984.

Mullins was a command pilot with more than 6,000 flying hours. His military decorations and awards include the Air Force Distinguished Service Medal with oak leaf cluster, Legion of Merit with oak leaf cluster, Distinguished Flying Cross, Air Medal with five oak leaf clusters, Air Force Commendation Medal with oak leaf cluster, and Air Force Outstanding Unit Award ribbon with "V" device and one oak leaf cluster.

  Air Force Distinguished Service Medal with oak leaf cluster
  Legion of Merit with oak leaf cluster
  Distinguished Flying Cross
  Air Medal with five oak leaf clusters
  Air Force Commendation Medal with oak leaf cluster
  Air Force Outstanding Unit Award with "V" Device and one oak leaf cluster

References

External links
 

1928 births
Living people
People from Jersey City, New Jersey
Military personnel from New Jersey
United States Air Force generals
Recipients of the Distinguished Flying Cross (United States)
Recipients of the Legion of Merit
United States Air Force personnel of the Vietnam War
University of Nebraska Omaha alumni
Recipients of the Air Medal
Recipients of the Air Force Distinguished Service Medal
United States Air Force personnel of the Korean War